Salkhan Fossils Park, officially known as Sonbhadra Fossils Park, is a fossil park in Uttar Pradesh, India. It is located 12 km from Robertsganj, near Salkhan village on state highway SH5A in Sonbhadra district. The fossils in the park are estimated to be nearly 1.4 billion years old. The fossils appear as rings on the boulders and are scattered in Fossil rings on boulders in the park which is spread over an area of about 25 hectares in the Kaimoor Wildlife range.

Geography 

The fossils found in the Sonbhadra Fossils Park are algae and stromatolites types of fossils. The park is spread over an area of about 25 hectares in Kaimur Range, adjacent to Kaimoor Wildlife Sanctuary. It comes under jurisdiction of the State forest department.

Development and research 

Geologists have been aware of the fossils found in the present-day park area since the 1930s. People who have carried out research in the area include Mr. Auden (1933), Mr. Mathur (1958 and 1965), and Professor S. Kumar (1980–81). On 23 August 2001, the area was featured in an article written by journalist Vijay Shankar Chaturvedi for the Hindi newspaper Hindustan. Subsequently, it was formally inaugurated as a fossil park by District Magistrate Bhagawan Shankar on 8 August 2002.

An international workshop was organised in December 2002, attracting participation from 42 delegates from India and abroad. Canadian geologist H.J. Hoffman was impressed by the fossils, and remarked that he had not seen such "beautiful and clear fossils" anywhere else in the world. In 2004, researcher Mukund Sharma further explored the area.

In 2013, the state government sanctioned 12.5 million for the development of the Salkhan Fossils Park.

References

Fossil parks in India
Tourist attractions in Sonbhadra district
Geology of Uttar Pradesh
Robertsganj